Right Here, Right Now is the eight studio album by Christian singer-songwriter Russ Taff. Released in 1999, it is his first and only album on Benson Records also his first full-length Christian album of new material in 10 years, after 1991's Grammy winning Under Their Influence, his limited country success of 1995's Winds of Change and released two years after the death of his father. Taff's father was a Pentecostal minister and a couple of his songs reflect that on the album. Taff and his long-time guitarist James Hollihan, Jr. produced the album.

Critical reception
Steve Huey of AllMusic says Right Here, Right Now "is among his more introspective efforts, exploring issues of strength, frailty, and the trials and joys of maintaining strong religious faith in the face of human imperfection. Taff is more confessional than many of his CCM peers, coming off as all the more effective in his message through his refusal to sugarcoat."

Track listing

Personnel 
 Russ Taff – lead vocals, backing vocals (3)
 James Hollihan, Jr. – electric pianos, synthesizers, organ, melodica, guitars, bass, drums, percussion, string arrangements (5, 9), backing vocals (5, 7), orchestrations (10, 11, 12)
 Leslie Norton – French horn (9-12)
 Robbie Shankle – woodwinds (10, 11, 12)
 John Darnall – string conductor (5, 9-12)
 Nashville String Machine – strings (5, 9-12)
 Marcus Hummon – backing vocals (1, 4, 8), harmony vocals (2, 3)
 The Otis Redwing Quartet – backing vocals (1, 4, 8)
 Molly Felder – backing vocals (2, 3, 4, 6, 9)
 Bonnie Keen – backing vocals (2, 3, 4, 6, 9-12), harmony vocals (5, 7)
 Marty McCall – backing vocals (2, 6, 9-12)
 Gale Farrell – backing vocals (10, 11, 12)
 Mary George – backing vocals (10, 11, 12)
 Gary Robinson – backing vocals (10, 11, 12)

Production
 Russ Taff – producer
 James Hollihan, Jr. – producer, recording, mixing 
 Lynn Fuston – string recording 
 Elizabeth Workman – art direction, design 
 Craig Samuel – photography 
 Glickman Entertained Group, Inc. – management

References

1999 albums
Russ Taff albums